Leopoldo ("Pichón") Contarbio (April 29, 1927 – August 24, 1993) was an Argentine basketball player who competed in the 1948 Summer Olympics and in the 1952 Summer Olympics. He was born in Buenos Aires.

In 1948 he was a member of the Argentine basketball team, which finished fifteenth in the 1948 tournament. Four years later he was a member of the basketball team which finished fourth. He played all eight games in the 1952 tournament. His biggest success came when he won the world title at the first World Championship (1950) in his native Buenos Aires.

References

1927 births
1993 deaths
Argentine men's basketball players
Olympic basketball players of Argentina
Basketball players at the 1948 Summer Olympics
Basketball players at the 1951 Pan American Games
Basketball players at the 1952 Summer Olympics
Pan American Games silver medalists for Argentina
Basketball players from Buenos Aires
Pan American Games medalists in basketball
FIBA World Championship-winning players
Medalists at the 1951 Pan American Games
1950 FIBA World Championship players